Michael Moseley may refer to:
T. Michael Moseley (born 1949), retired United States Air Force four-star general 
Michael E. Moseley, American anthropologist at the University of Florida
Michael Moseley (rugby league) (born 1960), Australian rugby league footballer

See also
Michael Mosley (disambiguation)